"Echo" is a song by Dutch DJ Hardwell. It features singer Jonathan Mendelsohn. It is the sixth single from Hardwell's 2015 debut studio album United We Are.

Background 
A music video, directed by Robin Piree and produced by Nadjim Tsouli and Alexander Nedyalkov, was released on 18 April 2015. The video presents an old man, who wandered through snow-covered mountains and his 'remorse over a lost love'. The song was described as a 'standout' track on the album.

Track listing

Charts

References 

2015 songs
2015 singles
Electronic songs
Ultra Music singles
Hardwell songs
Songs written by Hardwell